Pasher Bari is a 1952 Indian Bengali-language romantic comedy film directed by Sudhir Mukherjee based on the short story of the same name by Arun Chowdhury. This film was released on 7 March 1952 under the banner of Production Syndicate. The film was a major success at box office catapulting Sabitri Chatterjee to stardom. Several Indian films were made adapting the same story including the Telugu film Pakka Inti Ammayi (1953), the Tamil film Adutha Veettu Penn (1960), the Hindi film Padosan (1968), another Telugu film Pakkinti Ammayi (1981) and the Kannada film Pakkadmane Hudugi (2004).

Plot
This is a love story of a simple man who falls in love with his neighborhood lady. The lady has ample interest in songs and dances. The man without having singing ability wants to impress her but fails. He takes the help of his friend, a good singer.

Cast
 Bhanu Banerjee
 Satya Bandyopadhyay
 Sabitri Chatterjee
 Dhananjay Bhattacharya
 Anup Kumar

References

External links
 

1950s Bengali-language films
1952 films
Bengali films remade in other languages
Bengali-language Indian films
Films based on Indian novels
Films based on short fiction
Indian black-and-white films
1952 romantic comedy films
Indian romantic comedy films